The Kerala Dalit Federation (KDF), is a political party in the Indian state of Kerala. KDF's President is Mr. P. Ramabhadran.

The women's wing of KDF is the Kerala Dalit Mahila Federation (KDMF). 
Political parties in Kerala
Political parties with year of establishment missing